Forlanini is an Italian surname. Notable people with the surname include:

Carlo Forlanini (1847–1918), Italian physician
Enrico Forlanini (1848–1930), Italian engineer, inventor, and aeronautical pioneer

See also
 Forlanini (district of Milan)

Italian-language surnames